The Tummal Inscription , one of the Babylonian Chronicles, is a writing of ancient Sumer from the time of the ruler Ishbi-Erra. The writing lists the names of the rulers that built the temples dedicated to Enlil within Nippur and temples of Ninlil in Tummal,  amongst whom were the king of Kish, Enmebaragesi and his heir Aga of Kish.

The chronicle was written by two persons from Nippur and, most likely, Ur. A number of religious analyses of the inscriptions find evidence within the text for a claim of divine intervention.

The inscription was useful in the understanding of the archaeology and history of Gilgamesh.

References

See also
Chronology of the ancient Near East

2nd-millennium BC literature
Sumerian art and architecture
Inscriptions
Gilgamesh